Mahmoud Ahmed Abdin (4 October 1906 – 4 June 1954) was an Egyptian épée and foil fencer. He competed at the 1928, 1936 and 1948 Summer Olympics.

References

External links
 

1906 births
1954 deaths
Egyptian male épée fencers
Egyptian male foil fencers
Olympic fencers of Egypt
Fencers at the 1928 Summer Olympics
Fencers at the 1936 Summer Olympics
Fencers at the 1948 Summer Olympics
20th-century Egyptian people